Dikan (Serbian Cyrillic: Дикан) is a Yugoslav comic strip. The comic follows the adventures of the title character and his uncle Vukoje as they travel around the Balkans as early Slavic scouts during the 6th century. During the 1970s, Dikan was one of the most popular comics in Yugoslavia.

Dikan was originally created in 1969 by artist Lazo Sredanović for Politikin Zabavnik magazine. Since that date, 24 Dikan stories were published in the magazine.

History
The creation of Dikan is linked to the changes in Politikin Zabavnik magazine. In 1968, Politikin Zabavnik switched from newspaper to magazine format, and the magazine's editor-in-chiefs, Nikola Lekić, thought that the magazine should, beside foreign comics, publish a domestic comic based on national history, perhaps modeled after Asterix. Lekić asked several artists to send their ideas about an early Slavic hero to the magazine. The working title of the comic was Bikan. On the editorial staff meeting, the drawings of painter Lazo Sredanović, who was a graduate from the University of Arts in Belgrade and until then had little contact with the Yugoslav comics scene, gained most attention. The suggestion to change the name of the character to Dikan came from translator Krinka Vitorović. First part of the first Dikan story, entitled "Buzdovanske igre" ("Morning Star Games"), was published in 903rd issue of Politikin Zabavnik on April 18, 1969.

Dikan stories were, during the years, written by a number of writers: Ninoslav Šibalić, Milenko Maticki, Branko Đurica, Slobodan Ivkov, and Lekić himself. Last three Dikan stories, published in 2004, 2009 and 2014 respectively, were written by Sredanović himself. In Politikin Zabavnik, Dikan was published in sequels, usually a page per issue. Until today, 24 Dikan stories were published.

In 1973, Politikin Zabavnik appeared in Slovene, and in Slovenian issues Dikan was renamed to Tilen.

In 2013, Serbian publisher Everest Media published first out of four planned books with collected Dikan stories.

List of episodes
"Buzdovanske igre" ("Morning Star Games", 1969) 
"Bitka u Crnoj Šumi" ("Battle of the Black Forest", 1969) 
"Tajne Singidunuma" ("Secrets of Singidunum", 1969/1970) 
"Zovite me Zokan" ("Call me Zokan", 1970) 
"Mis Papričica" ("Miss Pepper", 1970) 
"Gospodar Dioklecijanove palate" ("The Master of Diocletian's Palace", 1970) 
"Uzbudljiva plovidba" ("Exciting Sail", 1970/1971) 
"Dikan i car Justinijan" ("Dikan and Emperor Justinian", 1971) 
"Velika trka" ("The Big Race", 1971) 
"Put u Sirimijum" ("The Road to Sirmium", 1971) 
"U zemlji Gepida" ("In the Land of Gepids", 1971/1972) 
"Dikan i poslednje Frruke" ("Dikan and the last Frrrukas", 1972) 
"Dikan i prvi reli" ("Dikan and the First Rally", 1972/1973) 
"Dikan i turistička zver" ("Dikan and the Touristic Beast", 1973) 
"Dikan i lokalni tiranin" ("Dikan and the Local Tyrant", 1973) 
"Dikantrop i Vesna Sapiens" ("Dikantrope and Vesna Sapiens", 1973/1974) 
"Dikan i špijuni" ("Dikan and the Spies", 1974) 
"Dikan i stari Sloveni" ("Dikan and the Early Slavs", 1975) 
"Dikan i pretnja sa Oriona" ("Dikan and the Threat from Orion", 1982/1983) 
"Dikan i Hazari" ("Dikan and the Khazars", 1993) 
"Dikan i Atlantida" ("Dikan and the Atlantis", 1993/1994) 
"Plava špilja" ("Blue Cave", 2004) 
"Praznik mimoze" ("Mimosa Days", 2009) 
"Dikan i Vukoje" ("Dikan and Vukoje", 2014)

Synopsis and characters
Dikan and his uncle Vukoje are Slavic scouts, traveling around the Balkans. Originally, the comic was set in the 6th century, before the migration of the Slavs to the Balkans, but some of the later stories are set in the ancient and more recent past. Dikan, armed with a morning star, is very strong, but is also sensitive. His uncle Vukoje is wise and has the experience which Dikan lacks. Dikan's talking horse Zokan and Vesna, a girl Dikan is in love with, appear occasionally.

Various Yugoslav celebrities were caricatured in Dikan: comedy duo Pavle Vujisić and Miodrag Petrović "Čkalja", TV host Mića Orlović, TV commentator Milivoj Jugin, members of the pop group One i Oni, and others.

Influence in popular culture
Dikan was used as a mascot for some of youth work actions in Yugoslavia.
Dikan appeared in the commercial for BIP's kvass.
In 1993, Dikan was the mascot of Belgrade Marathon.

Legacy
In 2009, in order to mark Politikin Zabavnik's 70th anniversary, Pošta Srbije issued a postage stamp with Dikan and Vukoje on it.

References

External links
Official website

Serbian comics titles
Yugoslav comics titles
Serbian humour comics
Humor comics
Adventure comics
Historical comics
Comics set in the Middle Ages
Serbian comics characters
Male characters in comics
Comics characters with superhuman strength
Comics characters introduced in 1969
1969 comics debuts
Fictional Slavic people
Fictional Serbian people